Erebotrechus infernus is a species of beetle in the family Carabidae, the only species in the genus Erebotrechus.

References

Trechinae